The 2008 show was hosted by T-Pain.

Performances 
 "What Up, What's Haapnin'"/"Swing Ya Rag"/"The Last of a Dying Breed"/"On Top of the World" - T.I. Feat.Ludacris, Swizz Beatz & B.o.B
 "Hero" - Nas Feat. Keri Hilson
 "Bust It Baby Pt. 2" - Plies Feat. Ne-Yo
 "Crazy World" - Young Jeezy
 "Cha Cha Cha" - MC Lyte
 "Play With My Yoyo" - Yo-Yo
 "Afro Puffs" - The Lady of Rage
 "Shoop"/"Push It"/"Whatta Man" - Salt-n-Pepa
 "Here I Am" - Rick Ross Feat. Nelly & Avery Storm
 "Universal Mind Control"/"Spaz" - Common featuring N.E.R.D
 "Can't Believe It"/"Chopped & Skrewed" - T-Pain Feat. Lil Wayne & Ludacris
 "Why Me"/"It Was a Good Day" - Ice Cube Feat. Musiq Soulchild
 "Marco Polo (song)" - Bow Wow Feat. Soulja Boy

Cyphers 
 Cypher 1 - Hurricane Chris, K'naan, Bun B, & Q-Tip
 Cypher 2 - Willy Northpole, Hime, Blaq Poet, & Cory Gunz
 Cypher 3 - Ace Hood, Juelz Santana, Fabolous, & Jadakiss

Winners and nominations

Best Hip Hop Video 
 Kanye West featuring T-Pain – "Good Life"
 David Banner featuring Chris Brown and Yung Joc – "Get Like Me"
 Common – "I Want You"
 DJ Khaled featuring Young Jeezy, Ludacris, Busta Rhymes, Big Boi, Lil Wayne, Fat Joe, Birdman and Rick Ross – "I'm So Hood (Remix)"
 Lil Wayne featuring Static Major – "Lollipop"
 Snoop Dogg – "Sensual Seduction"

Best Hip Hop Collaboration 
 DJ Khaled featuring Young Jeezy, Ludacris, Busta Rhymes, Big Boi, Lil Wayne, Fat Joe, Birdman and Rick Ross – "I'm So Hood (Remix)"
 David Banner featuring Chris Brown and Yung Joc – "Get Like Me"
 Flo Rida featuring T-Pain – "Low"
 Plies featuring Ne-Yo – "Bust It Baby Pt. 2"
 Kanye West featuring T-Pain – "Good Life"

Best Live Performer 
 Kanye West
 Busta Rhymes 
 Jay-Z
 Lil Wayne
 T.I.

Lyricist of the Year 
 Lil Wayne
 Jay-Z
 Nas
 T.I.
 Kanye West

Video Director of the Year  
 Chris Robinson
 Gil Green
 R. Malcolm Jones
 Rage
 Hype Williams

Producer of the Year 
 Akon
 Bangladesh
 David Banner
 J.R. Rotem
 The Runners

MVP of the Year 
 Lil Wayne
 DJ Khaled
 Jay-Z
 T.I.
 Kanye West

Track of the Year 
 ?
 "A Milli" – Produced by Bangladesh (Lil Wayne)
 "Dey Know" – Produced by Balis Beatz (Shawty Lo)
 "Good Life" – Produced by Kanye West and DJ Toomp (Kanye West featuring T-Pain)
 "Lollipop" – Produced by Jim Jonsin and Deezle (Lil Wayne featuring Static Major)
 "Roc Boys (And the Winner Is)..." – Produced by Sean Combs and The Hitmen (Jay-Z)

CD of the Year 
 Lil Wayne – Tha Carter III
 Jay-Z – American Gangster
 Lupe Fiasco – Lupe Fiasco's The Cool
 Nas – Untitled
 Kanye West – Graduation

Who New? Rookie of the Year 
 Shawty Lo
 Ace Hood
 Flo Rida
 Maino
 Rocko

DJ of the Year 
 DJ Khaled
 DJ Drama
 DJ Felli Fel
 DJ Tony Neal
 DJ Greg Street

Hustler of the Year 
 P. Diddy
 50 Cent
 DJ Khaled
 Jay-Z
 Lil Wayne

Alltel Wireless People’s Champ Award 
 Lil Wayne – "A Milli"
 Lupe Fiasco featuring Matthew Santos – "Superstar"
 Plies featuring Ne-Yo – "Bust It Baby Pt. 2"
 Rick Ross featuring Nelly and Avery Storm – "Here I Am"
 Young Jeezy featuring Kanye West – "Put On"
 Yung Berg featuring Casha – "The Business"

Hottest Hip Hop Ringtone of the Year 
 Lil Wayne featuring Static Major – "Lollipop"
 Flo Rida featuring T-Pain – "Low"
 Plies featuring Ne-Yo – "Bust It Baby Pt. 2"
 Rocko – "Umma Do Me"
 Yung Berg featuring Casha – "The Business"

Best UK Hip Hop Act 
 Giggs
 Chipmunk
 Dizzee Rascal
 Ghetto
 Skepta
 Wiley

I Am Hip-Hop 
 Russell Simmons

References

BET Hip Hop Awards
2008 music awards